Khalaj is a village in Torqabeh Rural District, Torqabeh District, Torqabeh and Shandiz County, Razavi Khorasan Province, Iran. At the 2006 census, its population was 17, in 6 families.

References 

Populated places in Torqabeh and Shandiz County